Kanyakumari Wildlife Sanctuary is a  protected area in Kanyakumari district,  Tamil Nadu South India declared in February 2008. The area is a tiger habitat. Seven rivers originate in the forest including the Thamirabarani River and Pahrali River.

Wildlife
The region is one of the most diverse wildlife forest location in India. Several new species of plants, amphibians and insects discovered here are found nowhere else, making it an endemic region. The area is a wildlife corridor with high biodiversity, and in addition to tigers, is home to the threatened species: Indian bison, elephant, Indian rock python, lion-tailed macaque, mouse deer, Nilgiri tahr and sambar deer.

Habitation
There are a few tribal villages in the sanctuary and adjoining reserve forests.

Threats
The Arasu Rubber Corporation had destroyed 12,000 acres of forest land to promote rubber estates. This triggered wide protests among the locals and environmentalists. The State government got a stay order and has continued turning forests into rubber plantations by leasing the land to third party contractors and landlords. Another incident was the uprooting of 20,000 forest trees in the guise of clearing the damage caused due to Cyclone Ockhi. This caused anthropogenic disturbance.

Notes

External links
 Kanyakumari Wildlife Sanctuary

Wildlife sanctuaries in Tamil Nadu
2008 establishments in Tamil Nadu
Protected areas established in 2008